"Moving With You" is a song by Belgian drum and bass producer Netsky, from his debut album Netsky. The song was released on 16 January 2012 as a digital download in the United Kingdom and Belgium. The song features vocals from Jenna G.

Music video
A music video to accompany the release of "Moving With You" was first released onto YouTube on 23 July 2010 at a total length of three minutes and fifty-one seconds. It has received over 900,000 views as of March 2016.

Track listings

Credits and personnel
Lead vocals – Jenna G
Producers – Boris Daenen
Lyrics – Jenna Gibbons, Boris Daenen
Label: Hospital Records

Chart performance

Release history

References

2010 singles
Netsky (musician) songs
2010 songs
Hospital Records singles